Nishan-e-Haider (NH;  or 'Emblem of the Lion'), is the highest military gallantry award of Pakistan. The Nishan-e-Haider is awarded posthumously and only to members of the Pakistan Armed Forces. It recognises the highest acts of extraordinary bravery in the face of the enemy in air, land, or sea. It has been awarded only 11 times since Pakistan's independence in 1947.

Nishan-e-Haider literally means "Emblem of the Lion" in the Urdu language. The word "Haider" is also the epithet of Ali, who is referred to as the 'Lion of Allah', a valiant warrior and leader. Ali was the fourth Caliph of Islam and declared bravest person by Muhammad. He is known by his courage, bravery and power in Islam.

History
The Nishan-e-Haider was established by the Government of Pakistan and named after Ali on 14 August 1947, the year that Pakistan became a republic. It was applied retrospectively from the date of Pakistan's independence on 14 August 1947. It is Pakistan's highest award and takes precedence over all military and civil awards. Of the eleven Nishan-e-Haider recipients to date, ten have been from the Army and one from the Air Force.

Although some consider it equivalent to the British Victoria Cross and the United States Medal of Honor, it is unique in that it has so far been awarded only posthumously. At one point in time the Chief of Army Staff of Pakistan was asked why it was only awarded posthumously, his response reportedly that if it is awarded to a living person he may be involved in dishonourable conduct in the future which may disgrace the Award.

Criterion
The Nishan-e-Haider can be awarded to all ranks of the Armed Forces for showing feats of extraordinary courage in confronting the enemy. As a matter of practice and precedent, it has only been awarded where it has been established that the recipient acted despite high risks and was martyred (shaheed) in the act.

Manufacturing
The Nishan-e-Haider is manufactured by Pakistan Mint on the order of the Ministry of Defence. It is forged from captured enemy equipment and consists of 88% copper, 10% gold, and 2% zinc.

Recipients

See also 

Hilal-e-Kashmir

References

External links

Military awards and decorations of Pakistan

Awards established in 1957
1957 establishments in Pakistan
Courage awards